Evagoras Avgorou is a Cypriot association football club based in Avgorou, located in the Famagusta District. It has 1 participation in Cypriot Fourth Division.

Evagoras Avgorou founded in 1938.

References 

Football clubs in Cyprus
Association football clubs established in 1938
1938 establishments in Cyprus